Sir Mountford Tosswill "Toss" Woollaston (11 April 1910 – 30 August 1998) was a New Zealand artist. He is regarded as one of the most important New Zealand painters of the 20th century.

Life
Born in Toko, Taranaki in 1910, Woollaston attended primary school at Stratford, and Stratford Technical High School. He studied art at the Canterbury School of Art in Christchurch. One of his teachers at the Canterbury School of Art was Margaret Stoddart. He became interested in modernism after moving to Dunedin to study with R N Field.

In 1934 he settled at Mapua, near Nelson, and married Edith Alexander two years later. They became part of a circle of local artists and writers which included Colin McCahon. After World War II the Woollastons moved to Greymouth, and the landscape of the West Coast became a major feature in his art.

It was only from the 1960s that Woollaston was able to paint full-time; previously he had taken numerous part-time jobs to support himself and his family. As well as painting, Woollaston wrote, poetry in particular having been a lifelong passion. His books included The Far-away Hills in 1960, and Sage Tea (his autobiography) in 1980. In The Far-away Hills, Woollaston acknowledges the influence of artist Flora Scales, who allowed him to study her notes from training by Hans Hoffman.

Woollaston was appointed a Knight Bachelor in the 1979 Queen's Birthday Honours, becoming the first New Zealander to be knighted for services to art (Peter Siddell being the second).

His youngest son Philip Woollaston was the (Labour) Member of Parliament for Nelson from 1981 to 1990.

Death
Woollaston died in Upper Moutere on 30 August 1998 at the age of 88.

References

External links
 Works at the Museum of New Zealand Te Papa Tongarewa
 Auckland Art Gallery Toi o Tāmaki: Works by M T Woollaston
 Toss Woollaston, Landscape With Fire (1960), Adam Art Gallery, Victoria University of Wellington

1910 births
1998 deaths
People from Taranaki
New Zealand Knights Bachelor
20th-century New Zealand painters
People educated at Stratford High School, New Zealand
Otago Polytechnic alumni
People associated with The Group (New Zealand art)